Mentor Xhemali,(May 11, 1926 - July 11, 1992) was a notable Albanian singer. He was well known as a baritone all over the world. He was born in Përmet.

References

Sources

External links
 Mentor Xhemali - Për ty Atdhe
Mentor Xhemali - Enver Hoxha Tungjatjeta

1926 births
1992 deaths
People from Përmet
20th-century Albanian male singers
People's Artists of Albania